The Ulster Junior Football Championship is a junior Gaelic football knockout competition organised by the Ulster GAA. The competition began in 1914, with Cavan winning during the inaugural title. The most successful county to date is Cavan, who have won on fourteen occasions. The championship has not been played since 1986 with Tyrone being the last winners. A number of counties such as Cavan and Fermanagh have participated in the Leinster and Connacht championships in recent years.

The winners of the Ulster Junior Football Championship each year progressed to play the other provincial champions for a chance to win the All-Ireland Junior Football Championship.

Top winners

Roll of honour

 1934 Replay ordered after an objection

See also
 Munster Junior Football Championship
 Leinster Junior Football Championship
 Connacht Junior Football Championship

References

External links
 Roll of Honour on gaainfo.com website
 Complete Roll of Honour on Kilkenny GAA bible

2
2